Oxynoemacheilus phoxinoides, the Iznik loach, is a species of ray-finned fish in the genus Oxynoemacheilus. The species is endemic to a single small stream, less than 5 km in length in the drainage of Lake Iznik in north-western Anatolia, Turkey. The species is abundant in its restricted habitat but the population seems to be declining with abstraction of water from the stream for irrigation thought to be the main threat but as climate changed reduces the rainfall in the region the likelihood of droughts is increased.

Footnotes 

phoxinoides
Endemic fauna of Turkey
Taxa named by Füsun Erk'akan
Fish described in 2007
Taxa named by Teodor T. Nalbant
Taxa named by Cevher Özeren